is a traditional Japanese culinary art form of filleting a fish or fowl without touching it with one's hands.

Ritual origin

It is a Shinto ritual, properly an offering to the gods, and originates in the court cuisine of yūsoku ryōri, dating to the Heian period.

Technique
The chef is dressed in Heian period clothing, most notably an  hat and  robe. The hitatare features long sleeves and a drawstring, which is used to tie up the sleeves during the ceremony.

Schools

This style originated in the early Kamakura period (late 12th century), in warrior households that had been bestowed the "Ikama" name by the emperor. In this school the art is called , hence this name is commonly used today.

Demonstrations
The ritual is occasionally done as an offering at shrines, with irregular schedule, and private displays are available by appointment with practitioners.

Notes

References

External links
 式庖丁 Shikibōchō, Mankamerō restaurant 
 生間（いかま）流式庖丁について About Ikama style shikibōchō 
 今後の式庖丁の奉納予定です Schedule of coming offerings of shikibōchō 
 生間流 式包丁 味すゞ亭 Misuzutei 
 "Kappo: Fine Cuisine at a Counter", by Isao Kumakura, ''CCEF counselors

Japanese cuisine
Fish processing
Shinto
9th-century establishments in Japan